This is a list of diplomatic missions in Myanmar.  In November 2005, the Myanmar government transferred its seat from Yangon to Naypyidaw.  At present, the former capital of Yangon hosts 35 embassies. Although the government has been encouraging other nations to move their  Embassies to Naypyidaw, the new capital is yet to host any embassies which all remain in Yangon. Other countries have ambassadors accredited to Myanmar, with most being resident in elsewhere, usually in either New Delhi or Bangkok.

Embassies in Yangon

Other Post in Yangon

 (Taipei Economic and Cultural Office)

Consulates/Consulates General

Mandalay

Sittwe

Non-Resident Embassies
Resident in Bangkok, Thailand unless otherwise noted

 (Hanoi)
 (Beijing)
 (Hanoi)

 (Kuala Lumpur)

 (Hanoi)
 
 (Tokyo)
 
 (Hanoi)
 

 (Kuala Lumpur)
 
 (New Delhi)

 (Kuala Lumpur)
 (New Delhi)
 (Seoul)

 (New Delhi)
  (Kuala Lumpur)
 (Kuala Lumpur)
 
 

 (Jakarta)

 (New Delhi?)

  (New Delhi)
 (New Delhi)
 (Tokyo)
 (Singapore)
 
 
  
 (Hanoi)
 (Hanoi)

 (Beijing)
 
 

 (Beijing)

 (New Delhi)
 (New Delhi) 
 (Singapore)
 
 (Hanoi)
 (New Delhi)

Former Embassy
 (Yangon)

See also
Foreign relations of Myanmar
 List of diplomatic missions of Myanmar
 Visa requirements for Myanmar citizens

References

External links
Yangon Diplomatic List

List
Myanmar
Diplomatic missions